Ryszard Oborski (born 2 May 1952 in Poznań) is a Polish sprint canoer who competed from the mid-1970s to the mid-1980s. He won ten medals at the ICF Canoe Sprint World Championships with three golds (K-2 500 m: 1974, K-4 500 m: 1977, K-4 1000 m: 1977), two silvers (K-4 1000 m: 1979, K-4 10000 m: 1981), and five bronzes (K-1 4 x 500 m: 1974, K-4 500 m: 1978, 1979; K-4 10000 m: 1974, 1983).

Oborski also competed in two Summer Olympics, earning his best finish of fourth in the K-4 1000 m event at Moscow in 1980.

References

External links
 
 

1952 births
Canoeists at the 1976 Summer Olympics
Canoeists at the 1980 Summer Olympics
Living people
Olympic canoeists of Poland
Polish male canoeists
Sportspeople from Poznań
ICF Canoe Sprint World Championships medalists in kayak